Albert Hanson may refer to:

 Albert Hanson (academic) (1913–1971), professor of politics at the University of Leeds
 Albert J. Hanson (1867–1914), Australian artist

See also
 Albert Hansen (1871–1943), American football player, coach, and politician